The 2003–04 Elitserien was the 70th season of the top division of Swedish handball. 14 teams competed in the league. The eight highest placed teams qualified for the playoffs, whereas teams 11–12 had to play relegation playoffs against teams from the second division, and teams 13–14 were relegated automatically. IK Sävehof won the regular season and also won the playoffs to claim their first Swedish title. This season ended the dominance of Redbergslids IK and HK Drott; the two clubs won every title except one from 1983–84 to 2002–03, but have only won one title between them since.

League table

Playoffs

Quarterfinals

 Sävehof–Kroppskultur 22–21  
 Kroppskultur–Sävehof 21–25  
Sävehof won series 2–0

 Skövde–Lugi 27–19  
 Lugi–Skövde 32–29  
 Skövde–Lugi 27–23
Skövde won series 2–1

 Redbergslid–Guif 26–24  
 Guif–Redbergslid 22–27 
Redbergslid won series 2–0

 Drott–IFK Ystad 22–25  
 IFK Ystad–Drott 21–20  
IFK Ystad won series 2–0

Semifinals

 Sävehof–IFK Ystad 26–27  
 IFK Ystad–Sävehof 19–29  
 Sävehof–IFK Ystad 27–26  
 IFK Ystad–Sävehof 26–30
Sävehof won series 3–1

 Skövde–Redbergslid 26–29  
 Redbergslid–Skövde 32–35  
 Skövde–Redbergslid 28–29  
 Redbergslid–Skövde 29–19  
Redbergslid won series 3–1

Finals

 Sävehof–Redbergslid 28–18  
 Redbergslid–Sävehof 14–25  
 Sävehof–Redbergslid 21–19
Sävehof won series 3–0

References 

Swedish handball competitions